Surrender to the Blender is the third album of London ska punk band King Prawn. It was released in 2000.

Track listing
Intro
Someone to Hate
No Peace
Day In Day Out
London Born
Be Warned
The Postman Song
Your Worst Enemy
American Funded Genocide
Amuse the Young & Amaze the Old
Espiritu Du Carnaval
Crackhead
The Postman Song (2nd Post)
People Taking Over
Freedom Day

External links
myspace.com/originalkingprawn
Golf Records profile of King Prawn
King Prawn interview

King Prawn (band) albums